Hesdigneul-lès-Béthune (literally Hesdigneul near Béthune) is a commune in the Pas-de-Calais department in the Hauts-de-France region of France.

Geography

Population

Places of interest
 The church of St. Denis, dating from the sixteenth century.
 The vestiges of an eighteenth-century chateau and its outbuildings.

See also
Communes of the Pas-de-Calais department

References

Hesdigneullesbethune